William Edward Graydon (born 8 May 1989), known professionally as 220 Kid (pronounced "two-twenty kid" and stylised in all caps), is an English record producer, DJ and remix artist. On the UK Singles Chart, his collaboration "Don't Need Love" with Gracey peaked at number 9 in 2020, while his remix of Nathan Evans' "Wellerman" with Billen Ted reached the top spot in 2021. He is based in Highbury, London.

Early life
William Edward Graydon was born on 8 May 1989 in Oxfordshire. His father Ken, former music manager for Bee Gees member Robin Gibb, named Graydon after seeing a number plate ending in WEG from a hospital window. He grew up in Thame and attended Magdalen College School, going on to study at the University of Exeter, where he graduated with a bachelor's degree in biosciences followed by a master's degree in sustainable development. Following the George Floyd protests in 2020, he set up a three-year scholarship for a high-achieving BAME student studying at his alma mater. He has dyslexia. He has a sister named Charlie working in the healthcare industry.

220 Kid's stage name originated from a charity effort where he ran , a distance corresponding to nine marathons, over seven days. The run was completed in 2013 on the Isle of Man in honour of Gibb and supported three medical charities. After moving to London, he initially used the stage name "Willie the Kid" (named after the cowboy) without realising it was already the name of an existing artist. He previously had jobs working for marketing company CPM Group, as a model in Singapore, as a carpenter, and at a Tesco grocery store.

Career
Prior to embarking on a solo career, Graydon went by the name "William Edward" and was a member of pop duo OMYO—an acronym for "Our Music Your Opinion"—alongside Tom McCorkell while living in Thame. The pair met on New Year's Eve in 2014 at the James Figg pub in Thame and made a bet to write a song together. They wrote a few songs over the span of several days, including "Lady", which was used in an advert by clothing retailer New Look. After being dropped by a major record label, they formed their own independent one; their debut single "Days with You" was released on Two Six Records in 2017, with its music video shot in New York City. Their first gig was supporting Drake at the Wireless Festival and their debut album was planned for September 2017.

Graydon's first song as a solo artist under the moniker "220 Kid" was "Lights" in 2018, which was a shift from OMYO's urban pop to electronic music. Follow-up singles "Pleasure to Love You" and "Let Me Stay" both featured vocalist Chilli Chilton. 220 Kid signed with Polydor Records in 2019. His debut single with the label was "Don't Need Love", a collaboration with English singer Gracey, which was released in December 2019. The song went on to reach the top ten of the UK Singles Chart, peaking at number nine in July 2020, and received a nomination for British Single at the 2021 Brit Awards. His follow-up single, "Too Many Nights" with Northern Irish singer JC Stewart, was released in September 2020, peaking at number 74 in the UK. He lists the Bee Gees, Timbaland, and Motown artists as a few of his musical influences.

Discography

Singles

Remixes

See also
 List of artists who reached number one in Austria
 List of artists who reached number one on the Dutch Top 40
 List of artists who reached number one on the UK Singles Chart
 List of artists who reached number one on the UK Singles Downloads Chart
 List of Polydor Records artists

References

External links
 
 

1989 births
21st-century British male musicians
21st-century English musicians
Alumni of the University of Exeter
Charity fundraisers (people)
Dance-pop musicians
English dance musicians
English DJs
English male models
English male musicians
English record producers
English songwriters
Living people
Musicians from Herefordshire
Musicians from Oxfordshire
People educated at Magdalen College School, Oxford
People from Weobley
Musicians with dyslexia
Polydor Records artists
British male songwriters
Remixers